Mario Andretti's Racing Challenge is a video game that was released in 1991 for DOS and was developed by Distinctive Software.
It is a racing game featuring a career mode modeled after Mario Andretti's career. The objective is to earn enough money by winning races to enter and win the indy car series.

Gameplay
The game is a 3D racing game from the 1st perspective. Replays can be viewed from the 3rd person perspective.
The player starts with $20.000 and has to earn money by winning races to enter the higher series.
The available series are Sprint Cars, Modified, Stock Cars, Prototypes, Formula 1 and Indy Cars.
The games contains one car per series  and twelve race tracks  are included:
 Indianapolis Fairgrounds
 Ascot Park
 Nazareth Speedway
 Michigan
 Daytona
 Pocono
 Laguna Seca
 Monte Carlo
 Silverstone
 Detroit
 Hockenheim
 LeMans

Reception
Compute! stated in 1992 that Mario Andretti's Racing Challenge "falls short of the ultimate racing simulation, but it does take us several laps in the right direction."Computer Gaming World  noted in 1991 that "it is the first time aficionados have been able to 'feel' the difference in six different types of racing." PC Format gave a 65% rating.

References

External links
 
 Computer Game World Review
 Compute! Magazin Review

1991 video games
DOS games
DOS-only games
Racing video games
Video games developed in Canada
Video games based on real people
Andretti
Andretti
Andretti
Distinctive Software games
Single-player video games
Electronic Arts games